Xcalibur is a Canadian children's television series.

Xcalibur may also refer to:
Xcalibur (ride), a spinning ride manufactured by Nauta Bussnik Baily
Xcalibur (software), a Thermo mass spectrometry software
Stylized spelling of Excalibur, the legendary sword of King Arthur
 , a film directed by Pierre Woodman
 Xcalibur, regional title of the South Korean musical production of Artus-Excalibur

See also
X-Calibre, a fictional superhero team in Marvel Comics
Excalibur (disambiguation)